Georgia Anne Rebuck Gould (born 18 May 1986) is a British Labour Party politician and the leader of Camden London Borough Council since May 2017, when she succeeded Sarah Hayward.

Early life
Gould was born in May 1986, the daughter of fellow politician Philip Gould, Baron Gould of Brookwood, who died in 2011. Her mother is Gail Rebuck, chair of Penguin Random House UK and a Labour peer. She has a younger sister, Grace, who attended a local semi-comprehensive secondary school Camden School for Girls with her. Grace being in the same mixed Sixth form year-group  as the actor Daniel Kaluuya. 

Gould studied history and politics at St Catherine's College, Oxford, and holds a master's degree in global politics from the London School of Economics.

Career
Gould became a Labour councillor on Camden London Borough Council at the age of 24 in the 2010 elections. She became leader of Camden Council in May 2017.

References

1986 births
Living people
Labour Party (UK) councillors
Councillors in the London Borough of Camden
Alumni of the London School of Economics
Alumni of St Catherine's College, Oxford
People educated at Camden School for Girls
Leaders of local authorities of England
Daughters of life peers
Women councillors in England